Shahrak-e Mokhtar (also Romanized as Shahrak-e Mokhtār) is a village in Shoaybiyeh-ye Gharbi Rural District, Shadravan District, Shushtar County, Khuzestan Province, Iran. At the 2006 census, its population was 55, in 10 families.

References 

Populated places in Shushtar County